Arixyleborus rugosipes, is a species of weevil native to India, Sri Lanka, Philippines, Malaysia, Borneo, Vietnam, Indonesia, and in Australia, Japan, Korea, New Zealand as an exotic species.

Description
Body is about 1.7 to 2.0 mm long. Body long and cylindrical. Head, pronotum and elytra are deep reddish brown. Legs and antennae are yellowish brown. Body globose, with moderately convex frons. Body surface is finely reticulate, with a few scattered punctures and fine hairs. Eyes are elongate, and deeply emarginate.  Antenna with 5 segmental funicle, short scape and obliquely truncate club. Pronotum elongate with substraight basal margin. Scutellum subround and shiny. Elytra slightly longer and wide as pronotum. Basal margin of pronotum is substraight. There is a narrow, shiny and smooth transverse strip found on elytral base. Elytral interstriae ridged. Declivity gradually sloping posteriorly. Declivital face is moderately convex, whereas declivital striae and interstriae are distinctly marked as on the disc.

Biology
A polyphagous species, it is found in many host plants.

Host plants
 Artocarpus chaplasa
 Canarium euphyllum
 Cinnamomum camphora
 Diospyros oocarpa
 Dipterocarpus turbinatus
 Hopea
 Shorea zeylanica
 Sterculia villosa
 Terminalia elliptica
 Terminalia manii
 Dipterocarpus grandiflorus

References 

Curculionidae
Insects of Sri Lanka
Insects described in 1915